Qaleh Darrehsi Rural District is in the Central District of Maku County, West Azerbaijan province, Iran. At the National Census of 2006, its population was 12,161 in 2,708 households. There were 11,743 inhabitants in 3,128 households at the following census of 2011. At the most recent census of 2016, the population of the rural district was 13,962 in 3,908 households. The largest of its 48 villages was Keshmesh Tappeh, with 4,046 people.

References 

Maku County

Rural Districts of West Azerbaijan Province

Populated places in West Azerbaijan Province

Populated places in Maku County